CJ Wallis is a Canadian director from Vancouver, British Columbia, notable for releasing the films: Perfect Bid: The Contestant Who Knew Too Much.

1990s
Based on some writing samples, Wallis received an interview in New York City for Late Night with Conan O'Brien. 
Co-Founded an online resource for Academy Award-nominated filmmaker Paul Thomas Anderson called "Cigarettes & Coffee" (which was re-branded as "Cigarettes & Red Vines")
Worked as a director's assistant helping to execute every step of a million dollar feature for four years alongside filmmaker Scott Smith on his award-winning picture Rollercoaster

2000s

Circumference (2006)

 Selected from over 80 pitches to win a slot on the prestigious Canadian film contest Crazy 8s with challenges selected film-makers to create a short film entirely within 8 days, with a total budget of $800 and with a raw-footage restriction of 30 minutes total. The result is a 10-minute single shot film called Circumference, which involves many characters, location changes and times of year that all end up back at the same place it started. Wallis became the first filmmaker in the contest's eight-year history to complete and submit a short film and music video within the rules of the contest.

969 MTV/Razer (2006-2007)

 969 was an hour long, Monday to Friday youth programming show on MTV
 Started as a junior producer responsible for 1 segment a week and within 3 months was directing the show and producing 3 segments a week. 
 In 2007, the show won the Leo Award for Best Youth Programming.

Last Flowers (2009)

 The William Morris Agency met with Wallis to discuss upcoming projects. Within a month of this meeting, Wallis was on the set of his second short film Last Flowers which starred frequent collaborator Joseph May and Sarah Slean. The short screened in festivals across the world and was nominated by the Leo Awards in the "Best Screenplay in a Short Drama" and "Best Actor in a Lead Role" categories.

Nokia (2010)

 Nokia had Wallis create two projects shot completely with their cel-phones. The first was a one-minute short featuring Connor Stanhope shot on a Nokia N-8 cel-phone. Based on the success of the previous advert, Nokia sent Wallis to Miami to shoot the Transformers 3 premiere with Michael Bay and Tyrese using a C-7 model phone.

2010s

Jet Life Recordings (2011-2020)

 Jet Life manager Mousa Hamdan invited Wallis down to Los Angeles to film a Curren$y concert "Rock The Bells", after the show ended Curren$y broke his ankle a month before a 60-day tour featuring Method Man & Big K.R.I.T. 
 The edit from the day "Trust Fall" featured marked the invention of embedding tweets-as-narrative and was radically different than previous vlog clips produced for the label. Shortly after, Wallis was named "President Of Jet Life Films" and invited onto The Smoker's Club tour.
 Wallis is responsible for most of the video, design & marketing for the label.
 Directed over 75+ music videos and 14 hours of film-quality documentary footage chronicling the day-to-day life of Curren$y & The Jets, most notably the JetFlix series which debuted on Pitchfork.
 Curren$y recorded five records in one night over music produced by Wiz Khalifa producer Sledgren. Wallis wrote and produced an original short film called "Revolver" which uses the music and the lyrics to craft an original crime film showing the darker side of New Orleans street life. The film is narrated by Fiend and features Cornerboy P, DJ Duffey, Mr Marcelo, Mousa Hamdan, TY, Young Juve and Lil Soulja Slim in co-starring roles.

BB (2014-2018)

 During limited off-time, Wallis wrote and produced the self-financed thriller "BB" which the film-maker intentionally selected first-time actors and performed the majority of the film's tasks himself. 
 The film follows a hard-edged girl named Leah Lamont, played by Jennifer Mae, turns to the world of web-cam modelling to help her girlfriend get money for a plane ticket to Romania to see her ailing family while an obsessed fan named Hal Bowman, played by Kristian Hanson, is planning a surprise of his own.
 The film features a soundtrack including Curren$y, Wiz Khalifa, B Real, Lil Wayne, Cornerboy P, Hayley Richman, Rykka, 3d Na'tee
 Synk Films has bought the US distribution rights and will be releasing the film in Spring 2018.

Perfect Bid: The Contestant Who Knew Too Much (2017-2018)
The documentary explores how Texas math teacher Ted Slauson became adept at recording and memorizing prices of products featured on The Price Is Right since its inception in 1972, culminating in him helping a contestant place a perfect bid during a 2008 Showcase Showdown, and ending in one of the biggest controversies in game show history as covered by Time, Esquire, TMZ and more. The film features 36-year show producer Roger Dobkowitz and television legend Bob Barker. The film won "Best Documentary" at the Orlando Film Festival on October 25, 2017.
 The film was acquired by Gravitas Ventures  and will release the film worldwide on May 8, 2018.

The Fiddling Horse (2018-2020)

An award-winning dark comedy about a woman named Leslie Heart who inherits a horse and, in an attempt to elevate her failing status within her high society circle, trains it to race while secretly executing a long-con with an ex celebrity jockey. Produced by Mallory Kennedy and CJ Wallis.

Stu's Show (2019-2021)

The documentary tells the story of warm-up comedian and TV historian Stu Shostak, Lucille Ball's personal archivist and friend who meets Jeanine Kasun and enters into a fight for her survival. The film features several television legends including Dick Van Dyke, Ed Asner & Wink Martindale.

Mad Mac - The Memory Of Jim McMahon (2020-2021)
Mad Mac is the feature length documentary about 2x Super Bowl Champion NFL Quarterback Jim McMahon.

Career

Feature films

Short films

Television

Music videos

Collaborations

Awards and nominations

2019 - "Best Comedy" - Hollywood Weekly Magazine Film Festival (WINNER, "The Fiddling Horse", CJ Wallis)
2019 - "Best Feature" - Golden Gate International Film Festival (WINNER, "The Fiddling Horse", CJ Wallis)
2019 - "Best Feature" - Gulf Coast Film Festival (WINNER, "The Fiddling Horse", CJ Wallis)
2017 - "Best Documentary Feature" - Orlando Film Festival (WINNER, "Perfect Bid", CJ Wallis)
2016 - "Best Director Of The Year" - NOLA Hip Hop Awards (Nominated, CJ Wallis)
2015 - "Best Director Of The Year" - NOLA Hip Hop Awards (Nominated, CJ Wallis)
2015 - "Best Video Of The Year" - NOLA Hip Hop Awards (Nominated, "Round My Way" - T.Y.)
2011 - "Best Music Video Of The Year" - Leo Awards (WINNER, "The Rose" - Sarah Slean) 
2009 - "Best Screenwriting in Short Drama" - Leo Awards (Nominated, Last Flowers)
2006 - "Best Youth or Children's Program or Series" - Leo Awards (WINNER, "969")

References

External links

 
 
 FortyFPS' YouTube Channel

Canadian male screenwriters
Film directors from Vancouver
Canadian television personalities
1981 births
Writers from Vancouver
Living people